Peter A. Ambroziak (born September 15, 1971) is a Canadian former professional ice hockey player, former coach and currently an executive. He played 12 games in the National Hockey League (NHL) with the Buffalo Sabres in 1994–95, and several seasons for minor league professional teams between 1992 and 2005. After his playing career finished, Ambroziak became a coach. Ambroziak is currently an executive in the Ottawa Senators organization, as head of hockey development for the Bell Sensplex hockey facility in Ottawa, Ontario.

Playing career
Ambroziak was drafted in the fourth round, 72nd overall, by the Buffalo Sabres in the 1991 NHL Entry Draft. Ambroziak played 12 games for the Sabres during the 1994–95 season, earning one assist.

Drafted from the Ontario Hockey League's Ottawa 67's, Ambroziak debuted with Buffalo's American Hockey League affiliates, the Rochester Americans, in the 1991–92 season; however he never fulfilled the potential that the scouts had seen in him.  He played with the Americans for parts of four seasons, and made a dozen NHL appearances with the Sabres during the 1994–95 season.

Ambroziak spent the next four seasons between the AHL, the International Hockey League, and the United Hockey League. In his six years in the minor pros Ambroziak never scored more than 29 points in one season. However, in 1999 he joined the New Mexico Scorpions of the Western Professional Hockey League, staying with the franchise through the league's merger with the Central Hockey League.  He scored 87 and 78 points in his first two years with the club, and averaged just over 40 points in the next three. His final season with the Scorpions was the 2004–05 season, the team's final season in the city of Albuquerque (the team moved to Rio Rancho, New Mexico beginning with the 2006-2007 season).

Ambroziak was the head coach and director of hockey operations for the New Mexico Renegades of the Western States Hockey League. Ambroziak joined the Senators organization on March 14, 2011.

Career statistics

Regular season and playoffs

References

External links
 

1971 births
Living people
Albany River Rats players
Buffalo Sabres draft picks
Buffalo Sabres players
Canadian expatriate ice hockey players in the United States
Canadian ice hockey left wingers
Canadian people of Ukrainian descent
Cornwall Aces players
Detroit Vipers players
Flint Generals players
Fort Wayne Komets players
Hershey Bears players
Ice hockey people from Ottawa
New Mexico Scorpions (CHL) players
New Mexico Scorpions (WPHL) players
Ottawa 67's players
Ottawa Senators executives
Rochester Americans players